Peter Connolly (8 May 1890 – 27 October 1959) was an Australian politician.

Connolly was born in Newcastle upon Tyne, England, and was elected as the Labor Party member for the seat of Newcastle in the New South Wales Legislative Assembly from 1927 to 1935. He died in Newcastle.

Notes

 

Members of the New South Wales Legislative Assembly
1890 births
1959 deaths
Australian Labor Party members of the Parliament of New South Wales
20th-century Australian politicians